Boise City is a city in and the county seat of Cimarron County, in the Panhandle of Oklahoma, United States. The population was 1,166 at the 2020 census, a decline of 7.9 percent from 1,266 in 2010.

History

Boise City was founded in 1908 by developers J. E. Stanley, A. J. Kline, and W. T. Douglas (all doing business as the Southwestern Immigration and Development Company of Guthrie, Oklahoma) who published and distributed brochures promoting the town as an elegant, tree-lined city with paved streets, numerous businesses, railroad service, and an artesian well. They sold 3,000 lots to buyers who discovered, on their arrival, that none of the information in the brochure was true. In addition to using false publicity, the three men did not have title to the lots they sold.

Stanley and Kline were convicted of mail fraud and sent to Leavenworth Federal Penitentiary. Stanley and Kline served two-year terms in the penitentiary. Douglas died of tuberculosis before beginning his sentence. The town nevertheless took shape and incorporated on July 20, 1925.

The Encyclopedia of Oklahoma History and Culture says that the origin of the town name is unclear, but offers three possibilities: (1) a Captain Boice who was a hero in the Civil War, (2) the town of Boise, Idaho or (3) the Boise Cattle Company, which ran cattle in the area.  It was speculated in Ken Burns' documentary, The Dust Bowl, that the town name was chosen as part of the original land scam to evoke a false image of the town, as "boisé" is French for "wooded".

Boise City's prosperity in the 1930s, like that of Cimarron County generally, was severely affected by its location at the heart of the Dust Bowl region.

Boise City was the location of an unusual event during World War II when it was mistakenly bombed by a friendly U.S. bomber crew during training. The bombing occurred on July 5, 1943, at approximately 12:30 a.m. by a B-17 Flying Fortress Bomber. This occurred because pilots performing target practice became disoriented and mistook the four lights centered around the town's main square as their target. No one was killed in the attack and there was minimal damage, as only practice bombs with four pounds of dynamite and ninety pounds of sand were used and the square was deserted, but the pilots were embarrassed. For the 50th anniversary of the incident, the crew of the bomber was invited back to Boise City, but all members declined, some for health reasons and others because they did not want to draw more attention to their mishap. The B-17's former radio operator did, however, send an audio tape that was played at the celebration.

Geography
Boise City is located at  (36.730115, -102.511419).

Climate

Boise City experiences a semi-arid climate (Köppen BSk) with mild, dry winters and long, hot, wetter summers. There is a large degree of diurnal temperature variation year-round.

According to weather data tallied between July 1, 1985, and June 30, 2015, for every location in the National Oceanic and Atmospheric Administration's official climate database, Boise City, Oklahoma, is the snowiest place in the state of Oklahoma with an average of 30.8 inches of snow per year.

Demographics

As of the census of 2020, there were 1,166 people and 440 households. The population density was 1,180.6 people per square mile (454.4/km). There were 675 housing units (230.4/km). The racial makeup of the city was 87.5% White (61.6% non-Hispanic), 0.1% African American, 0.3% Native American, 0.0% Asian, 3.6% from two or more races. Hispanic or Latino of any race were 34.4% of the population.

As of 2020, there were 440 households, with an average family size of 3 people. 46.8% were married couples living together, 28.63% had a female householder with no husband present, 13.8% had a male householder with no husband present, and 10.7% were cohabiting. The average household size was 2.

The population age was distributed such that 8.1% were 5 years or younger, 31.2% were between 5 and 18 years old, 68.8% were 18 years or older, and 16.8% were 65 years and older. The median age was 35.2 years. 

The median income for a household in the city was $42,750, and the median income for a family was $46,350.

Economy
The local economy is based on ranching, farming, and the production of oil and natural gas.

The local paper, starting as the Cimarron News in 1898 in Kenton, Oklahoma, has been known as The Boise City News since 1930.  Calling itself The Official Newspaper of Cimarron County, it is available in both print and digital editions.

Transportation

Highways include U.S. routes 56, 64, 287, 385, 412, and State Highway 325.

The Boise City Airport, which serves all of the county, is located approximately six miles north of the town center.

Commercial air transport is available out of Liberal Mid-America Regional Airport in Kansas approximately 99 miles east-northeast of town, or the larger Rick Husband Amarillo International Airport in Texas about 127 miles south-southeast of town.

Freight rail service is provided by BNSF Railway.

Attractions
The Cimarron Heritage Center Museum includes exhibits and artifacts on dinosaurs, the Santa Fe Trail and other local historic sites.  The museum grounds showcase a restored Santa Fe Depot, a blacksmith shop, a one-room schoolhouse, a windmill exhibit, buggies, and more.  The grounds are home to "Cimmy" the "Cimarronasaurus", a metal sculpture 65 ft. long and 35 ft. tall, said to be a life-sized Apatosaurus dinosaur cut-out calculated from the bones of a dinosaur that was actually excavated in western Cimarron County in the 1930s.

The Cimarron County Chamber of Commerce is located in a red train caboose.  Out front of the caboose is featured the Boise City Bomb Memorial, commemorating the accidental 1943 aerial bombardment.

Autograph Rock Historic District, containing rutted traces of the Cimarron Cutoff of the Santa Fe Trail, features Autograph Rock, inscribed with the names of travelers from the 1850-1865 era.  Access to the site can be granted at the Cimarron Heritage Center Museum.  The separate Cold Spring and Inscription Rock Historic District similarly features Inscription Rock with Santa Fe Trail travelers' names inscribed, but also has a former camp site with a stone building that served as a stagecoach station, and a stone spring house.

The Cimarron County Courthouse was designed by M.C. Parker in the Classical Revival and Neoclassical styles and constructed in red brick.  It opened in 1926 after the previous wood-frame courthouse burned down.

Notable people
 Vera Miles, actress

In popular culture
Boise City during the Dust Bowl was the main setting for the 99th episode of the horror podcast The Magnus Archives.

See also

 LORAN-C transmitter Boise
 National Register of Historic Places listings in Cimarron County, Oklahoma

Notes

References

Further reading

External links

 Boise City Public Schools
 The Boise City News, local newspaper
 Encyclopedia of Oklahoma History and Culture - Boise City

Cities in Cimarron County, Oklahoma
Cities in Oklahoma
County seats in Oklahoma
Oklahoma Panhandle
Populated places established in 1908
1908 establishments in Oklahoma